The 1996 Laurence Olivier Awards were held in 1996 in London celebrating excellence in West End theatre by the Society of London Theatre.

Winners and nominees
Details of winners (in bold) and nominees, in each award category, per the Society of London Theatre.

{| class=wikitable width="100%"
|-
! width="50%" | Play of the Year
! width="50%" | Best New Musical
|-
| valign="top" |
 Skylight by David Hare – National Theatre Cottesloe / Wyndham's Pentecost by David Edgar – RSC at the Young Vic
 Taking Sides by Ronald Harwood – Criterion
 The Steward of Christendom by Sebastian Barry – Royal Court
| valign="top" |
 Jolson – Victoria Palace Fame – Cambridge
 Hot Mikado – Queen's
 Mack and Mabel – Piccadilly
|-
! colspan=1| Best Comedy
|-
|
 Mojo by Jez Butterworth – Royal Court Communicating Doors by Alan Ayckbourn – Gielgud / Savoy
 Funny Money by Ray Cooney – Playhouse
|-
! style="width="50%" | Best Actor
! style="width="50%" | Best Actress
|-
| valign="top" |
 Alex Jennings as Peer Gynt in Peer Gynt – RSC at the Young Vic Michael Gambon as Tom Sergeant in Skylight – National Theatre Cottesloe / Wyndham's
 Daniel Massey as Wilhelm Furtwängler in Taking Sides – Criterion
 Donal McCann as Thomas Dunne in The Steward of Christendom – Royal Court
| valign="top" |
 Judi Dench as Christine Foskett in Absolute Hell – National Theatre Lyttelton Diana Rigg as Mother Courage in Mother Courage and Her Children – National Theatre Olivier
 Zoë Wanamaker as Amanda Wingfield in The Glass Menagerie – Donmar Warehouse / Comedy
 Lia Williams as Kyra Hollis in Skylight – National Theatre Cottesloe / Wyndham's
|-
! style="width="50%" | Best Actor in a Musical
! style="width="50%" | Best Actress in a Musical
|-
| valign="top" |
 Adrian Lester as Robert in Company – Donmar Warehouse Brian Conley as Al Jolson in Jolson – Victoria Palace
 Ross Lehman as Koko in Hot Mikado – Queen's
 Clarke Peters as Nat King Cole in Unforgettable – Garrick
| valign="top" |
 Judi Dench as Desirée Armfeldt in A Little Night Music – National Theatre Olivier Elizabeth Mansfield as Marie Lloyd in Marie – Fortune
 Caroline O'Connor as Mabel Normand in Mack and Mabel – Piccadilly
 Elaine Paige as Norma Desmond in Sunset Boulevard – Adelphi
|-
! style="width="50%" | Best Supporting Performance
! style="width="50%" | Best Supporting Performance in a Musical
|-
| valign="top" |
 Simon Russell Beale as Mosca in Volpone – National Theatre Olivier Ben Chaplin as Tom Wingfield in The Glass Menagerie – Donmar Warehouse / Comedy
 Geraldine McEwan as Lady Wishfort in The Way of the World – National Theatre Lyttelton
 Claire Skinner as Laura Wingfield in The Glass Menagerie – Donmar Warehouse / Comedy
| valign="top" |
 Sheila Gish as Joanne in Company – Donmar Warehouse John Bennett as Louis Epstein in Jolson – Victoria Palace
 Siân Phillips as Madame Armfeldt in A Little Night Music – National Theatre Olivier
 Sophie Thompson as Amy in Company – Donmar Warehouse
|-
! style="width="50%" | Best Director
! style="width="50%" | Best Theatre Choreographer
|-
| valign="top" |
 Sam Mendes for Company – Donmar Warehouse and The Glass Menagerie – Donmar Warehouse / Comedy Richard Eyre for La Grande Magia – National Theatre Lyttelton and Skylight – National Theatre Cottesloe / Wyndham's
 Adrian Noble for A Midsummer Night's Dream – RSC at the Barbican
 Matthew Warchus for Henry V – RSC at the Barbican and Volpone – National Theatre Olivier
| valign="top" |
 Dein Perry for Tap Dogs – Sadler's Wells Lars Bethke for Fame – Cambridge
 Wayne McGregor for A Little Night Music – National Theatre Olivier
|-
! colspan=1| Best Set Designer
! colspan=1| Best Costume Designer
|-
| valign="top" |
 John Napier for Burning Blue – Theatre Royal Haymarket John Gunter for Absolute Hell – National Theatre Lyttelton, Skylight – National Theatre Cottesloe / Wyndham's and Twelfth Night – RSC at the Barbican
 Rob Howell for The Glass Menagerie – Donmar Warehouse / Comedy
 Anthony Ward for A Midsummer Night's Dream – RSC at the Barbican, La Grande Magia and The Way of the World – National Theatre Lyttelton
| valign="top" |
 Anthony Ward for A Midsummer Night's Dream – RSC at the Barbican, La Grande Magia and The Way of the World – National Theatre Lyttelton Deirdre Clancy for Absolute Hell – National Theatre Lyttelton and Twelfth Night – RSC at the Barbican
 Nicky Gillibrand for A Little Night Music – National Theatre Olivier
 Richard Hudson for Volpone – National Theatre Olivier
|-
! colspan=1| Best Lighting Designer
|-
|
 David Hersey for Burning Blue – Theatre Royal Haymarket, The Glass Menagerie – Donmar Warehouse / Comedy and Twelfth Night – RSC at the Barbican Mark Henderson for Absolute Hell and La Grande Magia – National Theatre Lyttelton and Indian Ink – Aldwych
 Peter Mumford for Mother Courage and Her Children, Volpone – National Theatre Olivier and Richard II – National Theatre Cottesloe
 Chris Parry for A Midsummer Night's Dream – RSC at the Barbican and The Way of the World – National Theatre Lyttelton
|-
! style="width="50%" | Outstanding Achievement in Dance
! style="width="50%" | Best New Dance Production
|-
| valign="top" |
 Siobhan Davies for choreographing The Art of Touch, Siobhan Davies Dance Company – Sadler's Wells
 Deborah Bull in Steptext, The Royal Ballet – Royal Opera House
 Sylvie Guillem in Episodes, Béjart Ballet Lausanne – Sadler's Wells
 Marion Tait in Pillar of Fire, Birmingham Royal Ballet – Royal Opera House
| valign="top" |
 Swan Lake, Adventures in Motion Pictures – Sadler's Wells Saints and Shadows, Arc Dance Company – Sadler's Wells
 SH-BOOM, 10 Dancers Ensemble – Sadler's Wells
 Who Cares, Les Ballets de Monte Carlo – Sadler's Wells
|-
! style="width="50%" | Outstanding Achievement in Opera
! style="width="50%" | Outstanding New Opera Production
|-
| valign="top" |
 Bernard Haitink for conducting Götterdämmerung and Siegfried, The Royal Opera – Royal Opera House Jonathan Miller for directing Carmen, English National Opera – London Coliseum
 Bryn Terfel in Salome, The Royal Opera – Royal Opera House
 John Tomlinson in Billy Budd and Siegfried, The Royal Opera – Royal Opera House
| valign="top" |
 Billy Budd, The Royal Opera – Royal Opera House A Midsummer Night's Dream, English National Opera – London Coliseum
 Salome, The Royal Opera – Royal Opera House
 Siegfried, The Royal Opera – Royal Opera House
|-
! colspan=1| Society Special Award
|-
|
 Harold Pinter'|}

Productions with multiple nominations and awards
The following 20 productions, including two operas, received multiple nominations:

 6: The Glass Menagerie 5: Skylight 4: A Little Night Music, A Midsummer Night's Dream, Absolute Hell, Company, La Grande Magia, The Way of the World and Volpone 3: Jolson, Siegfried and Twelfth Night 2: Burning Blue, Fame, Hot Mikado, Mack and Mabel, Mother Courage and Her Children, Salome, Taking Sides and The Steward of ChristendomThe following three productions received multiple awards:

 3: Company 2: Burning Blue and The Glass Menagerie''

See also
 50th Tony Awards

References

External links
 Previous Olivier Winners – 1996

Laurence Olivier Awards ceremonies
Laurence Olivier Awards, 1996
Laurence Olivier Awards
Laurence Olivier Awards